Delhi is a town in Delaware County, New York, United States. The population was 4,795 at the 2020 census. The town is in the east-central part of the county and contains the village of Delhi. The State University of New York at Delhi is located in the town.

The town is named after the city of Delhi, the capital of India. The name was in honor of founder Ebenezer Foote, who was known as "The Great Mogul". Another founder, Erastus Root, a rival of Foote, is responsible for the pronunciation. Root preferred the name "Mapleton". When he learned the town was to be named Delhi, he exclaimed, "Delhi, Hell-high! Might as well call it Foote-high."

The town is the setting of the 1959 novel My Side of the Mountain by Jean Craighead George.

History
Delhi was formed from the towns of Kortright, Middletown, and Walton, on March 23, 1798. It was named after Delhi in India.

Geography
The town is in the center of Delaware County. The West Branch Delaware River flows through the center of the town. The Little Delaware River enters the West Branch from the east, just south of Delhi village.

Demographics

2000

As of the census of 2000, there were 4,629 people, 1,493 households, and 928 families residing in the town. The population density was 71.7 people per square mile (27.7/km2). There were 1,818 housing units at an average density of 28.2 per square mile (10.9/km2). The racial makeup of the town was 91.90% White, 4.23% Black or African American, 0.26% Native American, 1.25% Asian, 0.02% Pacific Islander, 0.91% from other races, and 1.43% from two or more races. Hispanic or Latino of any race were 2.68% of the population.

There were 1,493 households, out of which 26.1% had children under the age of 18 living with them, 50.2% were married couples living together, 8.9% had a female householder with no husband present, and 37.8% were non-families. 30.0% of all households were made up of individuals, and 13.3% had someone living alone who was 65 years of age or older.  The average household size was 2.29 and the average family size was 2.84.

In the town, the population was spread out, with 16.0% under the age of 18, 27.5% from 18 to 24, 18.0% from 25 to 44, 20.6% from 45 to 64, and 17.8% who were 65 years of age or older.  The median age was 34 years. For every 100 females, there were 100.9 males.  For every 100 females age 18 and over, there were 98.3 males.

The median income for a household in the town was $35,861, and the median income for a family was $48,125. Males had a median income of $31,136 versus $25,542 for females. The per capita income for the town was $16,842.  About 5.9% of families and 9.8% of the population were below the poverty line, including 13.1% of those under age 18 and 5.9% of those age 65 or over.

Communities and locations in the Town of Delhi
Delhi – a village in the center of the town
East Delhi – a hamlet northeast of Delhi village. The Christian Church and Fitches Covered Bridge are listed on the National Register of Historic Places.
Fraser – a hamlet southwest of Delhi village on NY 10
West Delhi – a hamlet west of Delhi village. Located here is the West Delhi Presbyterian Church, Manse, and Cemetery, which was listed on the National Register of Historic Places in 2008.

Landmarks

 Delaware County Courthouse
 Gideon Frisbee House, where Delaware County was formed in 1797, now the site of the Delaware County Historical Association
 Soldiers Monument, erected to honor Civil War veterans, on the Courthouse Square
 Delhi Village Hall, formerly the Delaware County Courthouse, where trials were held during the Anti-Rent War
 Fitches Covered Bridge, built in 1870
 The Judge Gideon Frisbee House, Murray Hill, and Sherwood Family Estate are listed on the National Register of Historic Places.

Education
 Delaware Academy (K-12)
 State University of New York at Delhi

References

External links
 Town of Delhi official website

Towns in Delaware County, New York
Populated places established in 1798
1798 establishments in New York (state)
New York (state) populated places on the Delaware River